U.S. Route 412 is an east–west United States highway, first commissioned in 1982. It runs the entire length of the Oklahoma Panhandle and traverses the Missouri Bootheel.

, the highway's eastern terminus is in Columbia, Tennessee at an intersection with Interstate 65, where it continues east as State Route 99. Its western terminus is in Springer, New Mexico at an intersection with Interstate 25.

Route description
U.S. 412, unlike other three digit highways, does not follow the standard numbering convention for U.S. Highways established by American Association of State Highway and Transportation Officials. The number 412 would have been used as a spur route of U.S. Route 12. Despite this, the two routes have never met with each other.

US 412 overlaps with U.S. 43, U.S. 56, US 60, U.S. 62, U.S. 63, U.S. 64, U.S. 65, I-155, and U.S. 270, runs parallel to U.S. 62 and U.S. 64 in various places and intersects U.S. 70.

New Mexico
The highway begins at mile marker 412 of Interstate 25 in Springer. It is concurrent with U.S. Route 56 throughout its entire route in the state at just under . Besides Springer, the only other town Route 412 passes through is Clayton, where it merges with U.S. Route 64. Just before entering Oklahoma, the highway touches the northwestern corner of Texas at a small road junction.

Oklahoma

Highway 412 runs across the Panhandle and northern part of the state passing through cities such as Boise City, Woodward, Enid, and Tulsa. Some major highway junctions include Interstate 35 in Noble County and several others in Tulsa such as I-44, 244, 444, and U.S. Routes 75 and 169.

Arkansas

The Arkansas section starts at the Oklahoma line, runs through the scenic Ozark Mountains in the northern part of Arkansas, and leaves the state at the Missouri Bootheel. Cities along the route include Siloam Springs, Springdale, Alpena, Harrison, Cotter, Mountain Home, Salem, Walnut Ridge, and Paragould. In Harrison, U.S. Route 412 is concurrent with both US 62 and US 65.

Northwest Arkansas

In the state's northwest corner, the route enters Arkansas. In Benton County, the route serves Siloam Springs as a major route through the southern part of the city. US 412 has a concurrency with Highway 59 that ends in east Siloam Springs. US 412 becomes four-lane and runs east to enter Washington County. The route enters Tontitown, passes the historic Tontitown School Building, and intersects Highway 112 before entering Springdale.

US 412 crosses I-49/US 62/US 71 in Springdale, where the route is four-lane with a center left-turn lane. Now named Sunset Avenue, the route passes through developed parts of Springdale, including many restaurants, hotels, and businesses before turning south, forming a concurrency with US 71B. The concurrency ends and US 412 heads east past the Springdale Municipal Airport and Highway 265 out of town. Again becoming four-lane divided, the route winds east to Hindsville.

The route nears Hindsville, including an intersection with a former alignment now designated US 412B. The community was bypassed in 2009 with a four-lane alignment of US 412. US 412 continues east, winding through forested land. Near Huntsville, the highway intersects another business route and Highway 23 before entering Carroll County.

Concurrencies with US 62 and US 63

The highway has a brief overlap with Highway 21 in the southwest corner of the county, and has junctions with many rural routes in Carroll County. The highway passes the James C. Chaney House and Stamps Store in Osage, the Dog Branch School, and the Yell Masonic Lodge Hall in Carrollton. In Alpena, US 412 begins a concurrency with US 62. This overlap is approximately  through many north central Arkansas communities, including Harrison, Cotter, Mountain Home, Ash Flat, and Hardy. In Imboden, US 412 breaks from US 62 north, now concurrent with US 63 until 2 miles east of Portia.

Northeast Arkansas

After the concurrency ends, US 412 runs due east to through downtown Walnut Ridge. US 412 runs near the Old Walnut Ridge Post Office, Missouri-Pacific Depot, and the Walnut Ridge Commercial Historic District, each on the National Register of Historic Places. Further east, the route intersects US 67 (Future I-57) at a full interchange before crossing the Cache River  and entering Greene County. Historically, the route passed over the water on the Cache River Bridge, but the 1934 Parker pony truss bridge was bypassed in 1995. The highway runs due east, intersecting Highway 228, Highway 141, and Highway 168 (which gives access to Crowley's Ridge State Park) before Paragould. US 412 runs as Kings Hwy in Paragould, passing the Linwood Mausoleum, US 49B, Highway 69, and Highway 135 in the city limits. The route continues east across the St. Francis River, entering Missouri.

Missouri

U.S. 412 crosses Missouri on its Bootheel, and runs concurrent with Interstate 155 east of Hayti to the Tennessee state line.

Tennessee

Still concurrent with I-155, US 412 enters Tennessee from Missouri on the Caruthersville Bridge before meeting US 51 in Dyersburg. The interstate designation ends as 412 turns southeast toward Jackson on a stretch of highway that was upgraded from 2 to 4 lanes in the 1990s. After leaving Jackson on its eastern side, US 412 passes through the towns of Lexington, Parsons, and Hohenwald before reaching Columbia. The section from Hohenwald eastward to I-65 near Columbia is overlapped with unsigned State Route 99.  East of I-65 at the eastern terminus of US 412, the route remains SR 99.

History

Arkansas Highway 68 is the former designation of U.S. Highway 412 from the Arkansas-Oklahoma State Line to U.S. Highway 62 at Alpena.

This section includes an open-spandrel arch bridge over War Eagle Creek.

Just east of Mountain Home, in Henderson, the highway crosses Lake Norfork, which at one time had to be crossed by ferry. Coinciding with the final trip of a Norfork Lake ferry at 8 a.m. Friday, October 14, 1983, the U.S. Highway 62 bridge across Lake Norfork was opened. Charles Gibson piloted the ferry on that trip, carrying three cars across the lake within the shadow of the bridge, which brought a 40-year era to an end.

Future
On May 20, 2021, Senator Jim Inhofe, Republican of Oklahoma, introduced legislation to designate the portion of US-412 between I-35 in Noble County, Oklahoma and I-49 in Springdale, Arkansas as a future Interstate. The bill, titled the "Future Interstate in Oklahoma and Arkansas Act", was cosponsored by senators John Boozman and Tom Cotton, both Republicans of Arkansas. The senators' stated reasons for seeking an Interstate designation along the US-412 included encouraging economic development, expanding opportunities for employment in the region, making travel safer and shipping easier, attracting new businesses, and better connecting rural and urban communities. Other supporters of the measure include the mayor of Tulsa, G. T. Bynum, and the heads of both the Oklahoma Department of Transportation (ODOT) and the Arkansas Department of Transportation (ArDOT).

Major intersections
New Mexico
  in Springer. The highways travel concurrently to east-northeast of Boise City, Oklahoma.
  in Clayton. US 64/US 412 travels concurrently to Guymon, Oklahoma.
Oklahoma
  south-southwest of Boise City. The highways travel concurrently to Boise City.
  east of Boise City
  in Guymon. The highways travel concurrently through Guymon.
  in Bryans Corner
  in Elmwood. The highways travel concurrently to Woodward.
  south-southeast of Laverne
  west-northwest of Fort Supply. The highways travel concurrently to Woodward.
  south of Waynoka
  in Orienta. The highways travel concurrently to Enid.
  in Enid
  in Enid. The highways travel concurrently to north-northwest of Perry.
  north-northwest of Perry
  north of Perry
  north-northwest of Morrison
  east of Morrison
  in Westport. The highways travel concurrently to Tulsa.
  in Tulsa. I-244/US 412 travels concurrently through Tulsa.
  in Tulsa
  in Tulsa
  in Tulsa. I-44/US 412 travels concurrently to the Tulsa–Fair Oaks line.
  in Chouteau
  in Kansas. The highways travel concurrently to West Siloam Springs.
Arkansas
  in Springdale
  in Alpena. The highways travel concurrently to Imboden.
  in Bear Creek Springs. The highways travel concurrently to Bellefonte.
  in Ash Flat
  in Hardy. The highways travel concurrently to southeast of Portia.
  in Walnut Ridge
  in Paragould
Missouri
  in Hayti. I-155/US 412 travels concurrently to Dyersburg, Tennessee.
Tennessee
  in Dyersburg. US 51/US 412 travels concurrently through Dyersburg.
  northeast of Bells
  in Jackson. The highways travel concurrently to northeast of Jackson.
  in Jackson
  northeast of Jackson.
  in Columbia.
  in Columbia
  in Columbia

See also
 U.S. Route 400
 U.S. Route 425

Special and suffixed routes

U.S. Route 412B in Hindsville, Arkansas
U.S. Route 412B in Huntsville, Arkansas
U.S. Route 412 Business in Jackson, Tennessee
U.S. Route 412 Business in Columbia, Tennessee
U.S. Route 412 Alternate in Oklahoma

References

External links

 Endpoints of U.S. Highway 412

 
United States Numbered Highway System
U.S. Highways in New Mexico